Clear Creek is a tributary of the Great Miami River in southwestern Ohio. The creek forms in the southeastern portion of Clearcreek Township, with major tributaries including (from east to west) Mad Run, Beech Run, Bull Run, Richards Run, Twin Creek, Gander Run, Goose Run, and Dearth Run. The watershed includes the highest point in Warren County east of Five Points (elevation 1,055 feet). It drains most of Clearcreek Township, Springboro, Ohio, much of Franklin Township, and then discharges into the Great Miami River in Franklin, Ohio.

Clear Creek was so named on account of the clear quality of its water. The creek lends its name to Clearcreek Township in Warren County.

References

Rivers of Ohio
Rivers of Warren County, Ohio